Showajidaia is a genus of sea slugs, dorid nudibranchs, shell-less marine gastropod mollusks.

Species
Species in the genus Showajidaia include:
 Showajidaia sagamiensis Baba, 1937

References

Nudipleura
Nudibranchia
Hirohito
Gastropod genera